Wolfgang Max Wilhelm Roth (1 October 1930 – 24 November 2013), also known as W. M. W. Roth, was a German pastor of the United Church of Canada and an Old Testament scholar with major contribution to the growth of Old Testament scholarship for more than half a century from 1959 through 2013.  Roth was a scholar in the line of Gerhard von Rad acknowledging the influence of the master-specialist of Old Testament ever since his study days at the University of Heidelberg, Germany.  Roth's writings drew the attention of the world of Old Testament scholarship through his writings which began appearing in journals like Catholic Biblical Quarterly, Journal of Biblical Literature, Vetus Testamentum, theological commentaries and other theological treatises.

Studies

Germany
Initial graduate studies were undertaken by Roth at the Universities of Tübingen, Heidelberg, and Marburg.  Roth acknowledges the inspiration of Gerhard von Rad, his Professor at Heidelberg.

Canada
Roth studied for postgraduate and doctoral degrees at Emmanuel College under the Old Testament Professor Robert Dobbie.  During Roth's study days in 1953 at the college in Toronto, he happened to be a companion of A. B. Masilamani, the Indian lyric writer who was studying at the college in 1952.  In their later years, both Roth and Masilamani happened to teach at seminaries in India affiliated to the Senate of Serampore College (University).  While Roth began teaching from 1959 onwards at the Leonard Theological College, Jabalpur, Masilamani was already on the faculty of a seminary located further south at the Baptist Theological Seminary, Kakinada.

Professorship

Leonard Theological College, Jabalpur, India
From 1959 to 1967 Roth taught Old Testament at the Leonard Theological College, Jabalpur, which is affiliated with the Senate of Serampore College (University).

Garrett–Evangelical Theological Seminary, Evanston, Illinois
In 1967, Roth moved to the Garrett–Evangelical Theological Seminary, Evanston, Illinois where he began teaching Old Testament. He was the Frederick Carl Eiselen Professor of Old Testament Interpretation from 1981 until his retirement in 1996.  The Seminary continued to keep Roth under its teaching faculty and designated him as Professor Emeritus from 1996 onwards.  Roth continued to teach at the Seminary until his death in 2013.

Writings

Books authored
1965, Numerical Sayings in the Old Testament: A Form-Critical Study
1968, Old Testament Theology. 
1988, Hebrew Gospel: Cracking the Code of Mark
1988, Isaiah

Books co-authored/edited
1966 (with H. Burkle), Indian Voices in Today's Theological Debate (republished in 1972)
1967 (with George Johnston), The Church in the Modern World
1974 (with George W. Hoyer), Pentecost 2
1978 (with Rosemary Radford Ruether), The Liberating Bond: Covenants-Biblical and Contemporary

Articles written
1960, NBL, 
1962, The Numerical Sequence x/x+l in the Old Testament
1963, Love in the New Testament,
1963 (in German), Hinterhalt und Scheinflucht
1963, The Historical-Critical Method and Its Function in Biblical Interpretation
1964, The Anonymity of the Suffering Servant
1964, An Approach to New Testament Christology
1968, A Study of the Classical Hebrew Verb SKL
1972, The Wooing of Rebekah: a tradition-critical study of Genesis 24
1972, Thought Patterns – Fetters or Opportunities?
1974, What of Sodom and Gomorrah? Homosexual Acts in the Old Testament

1975, For Life, He Appeals to Death (Wis 13:18).  A Study of Old Testament Idol Parodies
1975, What of Sodom and Gomorrah? Homosexual Acts in the Old Testament
1976, The Deuteronomic Rest Theology: A Redaction-Critical Study,
1977, You are the Man! Structural Interaction in 2 Samuel 10–12
1977, The Language of Peace: Shalom and Eirene
1979, The Text is the Medium: An Interpretation of the Jacob Stories in Genesis
1980, On the Gnomic-Discursive Wisdom of Jesus Ben Sirach,
1981 (in German), Deuteronomistisches Geschichtswerk/Deuteronomistische Schule
1982, The Story of the Prophet Micaiah (1 Kings 22) in Historical-Critical Interpretation
1983, The Secret of the Kingdom
1992, Mark, John and their Old Testament Codes
1999, Rhetorical Criticism, Hebrew Bible

References
Notes

Further reading
 
 

1930 births
2013 deaths
German biblical scholars
Old Testament scholars
Heidelberg University alumni
University of Marburg alumni
University of Tübingen alumni
University of Toronto alumni
German male writers
Methodist writers
German Methodists
Clergy from Darmstadt
Ministers of the United Church of Canada
Academic staff of the Senate of Serampore College (University)